The 2015–16 Guinée Championnat National season was the top level of football competition in Guinea. It began on 11 December 2015 and concluded on 27 July 2016.

Teams
Twelve teams participated this season. Half of those sides play their home matches in Conakry at Stade du 28 Septembre. ASFAG and Flamme Olympique FC were promoted from the Championnat National de Ligue 2.

Stadia and locations

League table

References

External links
 Guinée Championnat National at FIFA

Guinée Championnat National
Championnat National
Championnat National
2015–16 in African association football leagues